Paul Amyrault (some sources Amyrauld) was a 17th-century Anglican priest in Ireland.

Amyrault was of Huguenot descent.
By Grace Lawless LeeHe was Archdeacon of Kilfenora from 1663 to 1690; Provost of Tuam from 1667 to 1667; and Chancellor of Killaloe from 1667 to 1674;

He was succeeded by his son Joseph Amyrault as Archdeacon of Kilfenora.

References

Archdeacons of Kilfenora
17th-century Irish Anglican priests
Huguenots